Watch Over Me is a young adult novel by Nina LaCour, published September 15, 2020 by Dutton Books for Young Readers.

Reception 
Watch Over Me received starred reviews from Kirkus, Booklist, Publishers Weekly, and School Library Journal. The book is a Junior Library Guild selection.

In reviews, the book was called a "gripping ... emotion-packed must-read," "a painfully compelling gem from a masterful creator," and a "[m]oving, unsettling, and full of atmospheric beauty."

The audiobook received a starred review from School Library Journal, as well as a positive review from Booklist.

The New York Public Library, Chicago Public Library, Buzzfeed, and Kirkus named it one of the best books of the year.

References 

2020 children's books
Novels set in California